Leontodon is a genus of plants in the tribe Cichorieae within the family Asteraceae, commonly known as hawkbits.

Their English name derives from the mediaeval belief that hawks ate the plant to improve their eyesight. Although originally only native to Eurasia and North Africa, some species have since become established in other countries, including the United States and New Zealand.

Recent research has shown that the genus Leontodon in the traditional delimitation is polyphyletic. Therefore, the former Leontodon subgenus Oporinia was raised to generic level. According to the nomenclatural rules the name Scorzoneroides has priority at generic level and therefore, the members of Leontodon subgenus Oporinia were transferred to the re-erected genus Scorzoneroides.

Ecology
Seeds of Leontodon species are an important food source for certain bird species.

Uses
In Crete, the species Leontodon tuberosus which is called ,  or  has its roots eaten raw and its leaves eaten steamed.

Secondary metabolites 
The genus Leontodon s.str. (i.e. excluding the members of the resurrected genus Scorzoneroides) is a rich source of hypocretenolides, unique guaiane type sesquiterpene lactones with a 12,5-lactone ring instead of the usual 12,6 lactone ring.

Phenolics found in Leontodon include luteolin type flavonoids and caffeoyl quinic acid derivatives such as chlorogenic acid and 3,5-dicaffeoylquinic acid. Moreover, Leontodon species contain the caffeoyl tartaric acid derivatives caffeoyl tartaric acid and cichoric acid.

Species
Accepted species

Leontodon alpestris
Leontodon alpinus
Leontodon ambiguus
Leontodon anomalus
Leontodon apulus
Leontodon asperifolius
Leontodon asperrimus
Leontodon atlanticus
Leontodon balansae
Leontodon berinii
Leontodon biscutellifolius
Leontodon borbasii
Leontodon boryi
Leontodon bourgaeanus
Leontodon brancsikii
Leontodon calvatus
Leontodon caucasicus
Leontodon collinus
Leontodon crispus
Leontodon croceus
Leontodon dandaleus
Leontodon dentatus
Leontodon djurdjurae
Leontodon dubius
Leontodon ehrenbergii
Leontodon eriopodus
Leontodon farinosus
Leontodon filii
Leontodon froedinii
Leontodon gaussenii
Leontodon glaber
Leontodon glaberrimus
Leontodon graecus
Leontodon hellenicus
Leontodon hirtus
Leontodon hispidaster
Leontodon hispidus
Leontodon hugueninii
Leontodon hyoseroides
Leontodon incanus
Leontodon intermedius
Leontodon jouffroyi
Leontodon kaiseri
Leontodon kerneri
Leontodon kotschyi
Leontodon kulczynskii
Leontodon kunthianus
Leontodon laciniatus
Leontodon laconicus
Leontodon lannesii
Leontodon libanoticus
Leontodon lucidus
Leontodon macrorrhizus
Leontodon maroccanus
Leontodon megalorrhizus
Leontodon molineri
Leontodon nivatensis
Leontodon oxylepis
Leontodon pinetorum
Leontodon pinnatifidus
Leontodon pitardii
Leontodon pratensis
Leontodon preslii
Leontodon reboudianum
Leontodon rigens
Leontodon rosani
Leontodon ruthii
Leontodon saxatilis
Leontodon siculus
Leontodon sooi
Leontodon stenocalathius
Leontodon subincanus
Leontodon sublyratus
Leontodon taraxacoides
Leontodon tenuiflorus
Leontodon tingitanus
Leontodon tomentosus
Leontodon tuberosus
Leontodon tulmentinus
Leontodon uliginosus
Leontodon vegetus

Further reading

Euro+Med Plantbase

References

 
Asteraceae genera